Sarjapura  is a small town situated in Bangalore, Karnataka, India. It is a hobli of Anekal taluk, Bangalore Urban district and is located towards the south-east of Bangalore. It is one of the industrial areas in Anekal taluk, with others being Attibele, Bommasandra, Chandapura, Electronic City and Jigani.

Demographics
 India census, Sarjapura had a population of 8620, with 4370 males and 4250 females.

References

External links
 A history of Sarjapura Road: Citizen Matters
 When Sarjapur meant Muslin
 Popular lieutenant lends his name
 Sarjapur famous for Muslin and Silk

Villages in Bangalore Urban district